Simon Harsent is a fine art and commercial photographer. The eldest son of British poet David Harsent, he was born in Aylesbury, England in 1965, and lives in New York and Australia. Harsent's work has been exhibited in galleries and museums worldwide.

Early life and career
He first studied photography at the Grange Secondary School in Aylesbury. After continuing his studies at Watford college, England, Simon moved to London and eventually to Australia, where he established himself as a leading commercial photographer. In 2000 he moved to New York City where he has continued his commercial career as well as concentrating on fine art work. He is co-founder of the POOL photography collective who, in 2011, published their debut publication, Blow Up.
In 2009, he published his first monograph, Melt: Portrait of an Iceberg which has been shown in The Australian Center of Photography, Oliver Gordon Galley in Toronto Canada, The Saatchi and Saatchi Gallery Sydney and The Alison Milne Gallery, Toronto Canada.
Harsent's work is included in the permanent collection at both the Queensland Art Gallery and The Powerhouse Museum.

Exhibitions

Selected solo exhibitions
2012 Melt: The Alison Milne Gallery in Toronto Canada
2012 Into the Abyss: The Sydney Opera House, Sydney,Australia
2010 Melt: The Saatchi Gallery Sydney, Sydney, Australia
2009 Melt: The Australian Center for Photography, Sydney, Australia
2009 Melt: Oliver Gordon Gallery, Toronto, Canada
2001 Untitled Nudes, Sandra Bryon Gallery, Sydney, Australia

Selected group exhibitions
2012 National Portrait Award, National Portrait Gallery, Canberra, Australia
2012 Blow Up at the Hazlehurst Regional Gallery, NSW, Australia
2011 Blow Up Fleet Steps Sydney Botanical Gardens, Sydney, Australia
2009 Px3 Essence of Water Espace Dupon Paris, France
2009 Px3 Essence of Water Farmani Gallery, New York, USA
2008 Gallery SAND, Amsterdam, Netherlands
2008 The Big Picture, Oliver Gordon Gallery, Toronto, Canada
2008 IPA Award Best in Show Traveling Exhibition
2007 IPA Award Best in Show Traveling Exhibition
2006 The Female Form, Bryon McMahon Gallery, Sydney, Australia
2006 Olive Cotton Award, Tweed River Art Gallery, Australia
1989 Street Kids, Town Hall, Sydney, Australia

Selected awards
2012 Australian National Portrait Award Finalist
2012 Archive 200 Best advertising photographers
2012 D&AD in Book Award for Blow Up
2012 PDN Photo annual for Schweppes
2012 Art Directors Club of NY Bronze Award Schweppes
2012 Art Directors Club of NY Silver Award The Ship song
2012 AWARD Awards Bronze award for The Ship Song Project
2012 Communication Arts Photography Annual
2011 D&AD In Book Award for WWF 
2010 IPA awards 2nd Place Advertising
2010 IPA awards 1st Place Nature
2010 Caxton Awards Best use of Photography for Leo Burnett Advertising
2010 Archives 200 Best Photographers
2010 D&AD In Book Award Melt Portrait of an Iceberg 
2010 D&AD In Book Award WWF Ghosts Campaign
2010 Australian Creative's Hotshop Photographer of the year
2010 PND Photo Annual Awarded Books Melt Portrait of an Iceberg
2010 PDN Photo annual Awarded Advertising WWF Ghosts Campaign
2009 AWARD Awards Silver Award WWF Ghosts Campaign
2009 AWARD Awards Silver Award WWF Ghosts Penguins
2009 AWARD Awards Bronze Award WWF Ghosts Gorilla
2009 AWARD Awards Bronze Award WWF Ghosts Tigers
2009 AWARD Awards Bronze Award WWF Ghosts Eagle

References

External links
Official website
Meltportraitofaniceberg.com
Theppolcollective.com
Canon.com

Year of birth missing (living people)
Living people
People from Aylesbury
Photographers from Buckinghamshire